Herbert Charles Travenio (born February 28, 1933) is a former American football player who played for San Diego Chargers of the American Football League (AFL).

References

1933 births
Living people
San Diego Chargers players
American football linebackers
American football placekickers
American Football League players